Fondón is a municipality of Almería province, in the autonomous community of Andalusia, Spain. It has an area of 92 km2.

Demographics

References

External links
  Fondón - Diputación Provincial de Almería

Municipalities in the Province of Almería